Thomas Mitchell March Tweedie  (March 4, 1871 – October 4, 1944) was a Canadian politician, lawyer and Chief Justice in Alberta, Canada.

Early life
Thomas Mitchell March Tweedie was born in River John, Nova Scotia, on March 4, 1871, to James Tweedie a Methodist Minister, and his wife Rachael Susannah. He graduated from Mount Allison University with a Bachelor of Arts in 1902 and subsequently entered Harvard University, where he earned a law degree in 1905. He was admitted to the bar in Nova Scotia in 1905, and then moved to Alberta where he would be one of the last individuals admitted to the bar in the Northwest Territories on July 10, 1907. Settling in Calgary he would begin to practice law with future MLA Alexander McGillivray, and was named King's Counsel on March 19, 1913.

Provincial career
Tweedie was first elected to the Legislative Assembly of Alberta in a 1911 by-election and served the Calgary seat that had been previously vacated by Richard Bennett. In this elected he ran under the Conservative banner. Tweedie defeated popular municipal alderman Thomas Skinner who ran as a Liberal candidate.

Tweedie was re-elected to his second term in the 1913 Alberta general election. The Calgary riding was broken up into 3 different ridings under the redistribution bill passed by the Sifton government. Thomas ran in the new riding of Centre Calgary. He won his second term in the legislature with a large margin defeating Liberal candidate John McDougall.

In the 1917 Alberta general election he ran for re-election in Calgary Centre, this time being defeated by Alex Ross who ran as a Labor candidate. Thomas would quickly make the jump to federal politics running in the federal election later that year.

Federal career
After Thomas lost his seat in the 1917 provincial election, he attempted a run at federal politics. Thomas ran as a Unionist member in the new Calgary West federal riding during the 1917 federal election. He won a comfortable victory and served as the first Member of Parliament for the riding in the coalition government.

Thomas served most of his first in term parliament, until he vacated his seat on October 14, 1921, after he was appointed as a Justice to the Bench.

Judicial career
Thomas was appointed as a judge to the Supreme Court of Alberta Trial Division in Calgary on September 15, 1921 and subsequently resigned his seat in the House of Commons. He served as a justice for 23 years, where he was known for his judgements on civil actions including contracts, bankruptcies, and torts, before being appointed as a Chief justice on August 16, 1944. Tweedie's reputation as a popular and well respected legal mind would be somewhat tarnished after his involvement assisting the Alberta Minister of Public Works Oran McPherson with his divorce in 1932. Tweedie would hold court in the judge's library in Edmonton to expedite the process, and when McPherson's wife challenged the divorce, the matter ended up in front of the Privy Council.

He would die a short time later on October 4, 1944 after attending a dinner in his honour hosted by the Lethbridge Bar Association at the age of 73.

References

External links
 
 Justice Thomas Tweedie: Alberta Archives
 

1871 births
1944 deaths
Harvard Law School alumni
Progressive Conservative Association of Alberta MLAs
Unionist Party (Canada) MPs
Members of the House of Commons of Canada from Alberta
Mount Allison University alumni
Judges in Alberta
People from Pictou County